Amina Rizk (April 15, 1910 – August 24, 2003) was a classic Egyptian actress who appeared in around 208 artworks including more than 70 movies between 1928 and 1996. She was calm in her later years, but described as a clown when she was young.

Life
Amina Rizk came from a poor rural area. She and her aunt, Amina Mohamed, moved to Cairo with their mothers; the pair were locked in the house after their first theatrical performance. She was popular for her roles as the kind-hearted mother in plays and films, appearing in major pictures such as Doa al karawan in 1959 in which she appeared alongside actors such as Faten Hamama and Ahmed Mazhar, and Bidaya wa nihaya, in which she played the role of the Mother to Omar Sharif, Farid Shawqi and Sanaa Gamil. She also starred in many TV Series between the 1980s until her death before which she was filming a TV series for the holy month of Ramadan.

Filmography

References

External links 

 

1910 births
2003 deaths
20th-century Egyptian actresses
Egyptian film actresses
People from Tanta